Wilmington Academy of Arts and Sciences (WAAS) is a private school in Wilmington, North Carolina that focuses on education for academically gifted students in grades 4-8.

References

Private middle schools in North Carolina
Private elementary schools in North Carolina
Schools in Wilmington, North Carolina